Bhawan may refer to:

Anand Bhawan School, Minority Institution in India, founded in 1949
Balwant Rai Mehat Vidya Bhawan, co-educational high school in South Delhi
Bhawan Bahadur Nagar, town in Bulandshahr district in the state of Uttar Pradesh, India
Guru Gobind Singh Bhawan, building at Punjabi University, Patiala
Rajiv Gandhi Bhawan, the building housing the Corporate Headquarters of Airports Authority of India
Rashtrapati Bhawan or Rashtrapati Bhavan, the official residence of the President of India
Rastrapati Bhawan, the official residence of the President of Nepal
Ravidassia Bhawan, a place of worship in the Ravidassia religion
Thana Bhawan, small town in Muzaffarnagar District in the state of Uttar Pradesh, India
Umaid Bhawan Palace, large private residence at Jodhpur in Rajasthan, India
 Vigyan Bhavan, New Delhi, Government of India's premier Conference Centre